Gisela Hochhaltinger was an Austrian figure skater who competed in pair skating.

With partner Otto Preißecker, she won the bronze medal at the 1930 European Figure Skating Championships.

Competitive highlights

With Otto Preißecker

With Georg Pamperl

References 

Austrian female pair skaters
Date of birth missing
Date of death missing